Ms. Pac-Man: Quest for the Golden Maze is a Microsoft Windows game published by Infogrames and released in 2001.

Plot 
One day, Professor Pac is talking to Ms. Pac-Man. He tells her about the Golden Maze in Cleopactra, in the Temple of Dots. He says that only a true pacventurer can get to the maze and beat it. Ms. Pac-Man sets off to the Golden Maze to beat it, but Blinky, Pinky, Inky, and Sue try to get in her way.

Reception 

It got mixed to negative reviews. GameRankings gave it 49%, and GameSpot gave it 3.7/10.

References

2001 video games
Maze games
Pac-Man
Infogrames games
Video games developed in the United Kingdom
Video games featuring female protagonists
Windows games
Windows-only games